The Old Greeley County Courthouse in Tribune, Kansas, is the former courthouse of Greeley County, Kansas. Built from 1889 to 1890, the courthouse was the first in Greeley County. Construction started only a year after the county was formed in 1888. William T. Heaps, who also designed Hamilton County's courthouse, designed the building. The sandstone courthouse has a plain design with an iron cornice. It was constructed by Allen and Oleson of Ness City, Kansas and William Ruff.

In 1975, Greeley County replaced the courthouse with a new building adjacent to the old one. The old courthouse became the Greeley County Historical Society Museum, which in 2021 is the Horace Greeley Museum.

The courthouse was listed on the National Register of Historic Places in 1976.

References

External links

Courthouses on the National Register of Historic Places in Kansas
County courthouses in Kansas
Buildings and structures in Greeley County, Kansas
Government buildings completed in 1890
Clock towers in Kansas
National Register of Historic Places in Greeley County, Kansas
1890 establishments in Kansas
History museums in Kansas